Magimel is the surname of:

 Benoît Magimel (born 1974), French actor
 Philippe-Antoine Magimel (1692–1772), French goldsmith and encyclopédiste

See also
 Maginel Wright Enright (1881–1966), American children's book illustrator and graphic artist, sister of Frank Lloyd Wright
 Magh Mela, also spelled Magha mela, Hindu and Sikh annual festivals